Clemson may refer to:
 Clemson, South Carolina, a city in the U.S. state of South Carolina
 Clemson University, a public university located in Clemson, South Carolina.
 Clemson Tigers, the athletic programs of Clemson University. 
 , a U.S. Navy ship class during World War II
 , any of several U.S. Navy ships

People
Anna Maria Calhoun Clemson (1817–1875), daughter of John C. Calhoun and wife of Thomas Green Clemson
Floride Clemson (1842–1871), American writer
Henry A. Clemson (1820–1846), American naval officer
Jeanne Clemson (1922–2009), American theater director
Thomas Green Clemson (1807–1888), American politician and founder of Clemson University